Limited traffic zone (LTZ) is type of restricted traffic area found in many historic European city centres where non-residents and unauthorized vehicles are prohibited from driving at certain times. These areas are relatively abundant in Italy, where they are called  (ZTL), but they also exist in Spain, Portugal, France and Poland with different names. Around 350 Italian cities have LTZs, and 250 have low-emission zones (LEZs), usually enforced with camera surveillance. They help protect historic city centres from excessive traffic, which would otherwise make the city less attractive. They can also be aimed at limiting pollution levels or at increasing administrative revenue by paying an urban toll.

In most Italian LTZs (ZTLs), vehicles transporting people with disability are allowed when displaying the appropriate badge. As Article 47 of the Italian Traffic Code defines bicycles as vehicles, cycling is only allowed if specified on the road sign. Unauthorized movement of vehicles in a ZTL is punishable by a fine under Article 7(14) in conjunction with the relevant city ordinance, and the fine is between 83 and 332 euros.

In 2009 the city of Florence issued an average of 1,253 traffic tickets a day, for an annual revenue of 52 million euro. The fines tripled over the previous ten year period. In the same year revenues from traffic fines in Milan were 81 million euro. About 53% of these fines come from LTZ violations.

Italian signage

Entrance signs 

The sign indicating the start of the ZTL is composed of a series of panels. The first, mandatory, has a square shape and contains the "no vehicles" sign and the written zona traffico limitato. Below this signal other panels are placed are positioned according to the type of ZTL. Panels are provided to indicate the period of validity, exceptions or limitations to the prohibition, report the presence of an electronic gate or provide telephone numbers to obtain information on the ZTL.

To allow drivers to immediately understand if the ZTL is active, municipal administrations often integrate road signs with electronic displays indicating, for example, ZTL attiva (ZTL active) or ZTL non attiva (ZTL inactive).

Notice signs 
The warning signs of a ZTL are not expressly provided for in the regulations implementing the Italian Traffic Code and therefore are created in analogy to the warning signs of urban intersection.

These signs must in any case contain the symbol of the ZTL, if possible integrated with all the panels present on the sign placed at the access gate. However, given that very often it is not possible to reproduce all the indications present on the main signal, the Ministry of Transport has established that the warning sign cannot contain more than two panels, to be chosen between:
 a time slot panel and a vehicle category panel
 two panels relating to two categories of vehicles (see )

Examples of generic warning signs, without supplementary panels:

Implementation in other countries 
In October 1988, Kraków implemented an LTZ in its city center.

In October 2012, Nantes was the first French city to adopt the concept of an LTZ in the city center.

In June 2022, Newcastle upon Tyne introduced School Streets with similar restrictions.

Navigation software support 
Most satellite navigation software does not avoid LTZs. Waze added support for LTZs in select cities in 2018.

Controversies 
In Italy, since 2007, many tourists were fined for entering a ZTL. These tickets often reach them by post several months after their stay in Italy, sometimes more than one year later. Unauthorized entry into a ZTL is the most frequent fine on rental cars, more than exceeding speed limits and unpaid parking. Many tourists are unaware of ZTL regulations, some misinterpret signage at entrances. The process is considered dubious by tourists and consumer associations because the signs indicating the prohibition of access to the ZTL are often not very visible and written in Italian. In addition, the value of fine is high (around 100 euros) and it is doubled for the same offense (once for entering the ZTL, another when leaving).

See also
Car-free movement
Congestion pricing
Low Traffic Neighbourhood
Pedestrian zone
Road pricing
Road space rationing

References

External links 
Urban Access Regulations in Europe

Road transport in Italy
Environment of Italy
Traffic calming
Car-free zones in Europe
Traffic law